Michael Foster Jr. (born January 16, 2003) is an American professional basketball player for the Delaware Blue Coats of the NBA G League.

High school career
Foster attended Washington High School of Information Technology in Milwaukee, Wisconsin. He led his team to a state runner-up finish in each of his first two years. For his junior season, Foster transferred to Hillcrest Prep in Phoenix, Arizona. As a senior, he averaged 32.2 points and 18.4 rebounds per game. Foster was named to the McDonald's All-American Game and Jordan Brand Classic rosters.

Recruiting
Foster was rated a five-star recruit by ESPN and 247Sports, and a four-star recruit by Rivals. As a freshman in high school, Foster committed to playing college basketball for Arizona State, but reopened his recruitment in the following year. On April 23, 2021, he announced that he would join the NBA G League, forgoing college basketball. He chose the G League over offers from Florida State and Georgia.

Professional career

NBA G League Ignite (2021–2022)
On April 23, 2021, Foster signed with the NBA G League Ignite, a developmental team affiliated with the NBA G League.

Philadelphia 76ers (2022) 
After going undrafted in the 2022 NBA draft, Foster signed an Exhibit 10 contract with the Philadelphia 76ers. Foster joined the 76ers' roster in the 2022 NBA Summer League. In his Summer League debut, Foster scored five points in a Salt Lake City Summer League game against the Memphis Grizzlies. On October 16, 2022, Foster's contract was converted to a two-way. He was released into free agency on November 23 following the signing of Saben Lee.

Delaware Blue Coats (2022–present) 
On December 5, Foster re-joined the Delaware Blue Coats.

Career statistics

NBA

|-
| style="text-align:left;"|
| style="text-align:left;"|Philadelphia
| 1 || 0 || 1.0 ||  ||  ||  || .0 || .0 || .0 || .0 || .0
|- class="sortbottom"
| style="text-align:center;" colspan="2"|Career
| 1 || 0 || 1.0 ||  ||  ||  || .0 || .0 || .0 || .0 || .0

References

External links
USA Basketball bio

2003 births
Living people
American men's basketball players
Basketball players from Milwaukee
McDonald's High School All-Americans
NBA G League Ignite players
Philadelphia 76ers players
Power forwards (basketball)
Undrafted National Basketball Association players